Sons of Thunder may refer to:

 Sons of Thunder (Christianity), the brothers James and John in the Bible (New Testament, disciples of Jesus)
 Sons of Thunder (Labyrinth album)
 Sons of Thunder (Sleeping Giant album)
 Sons of Thunder (band), a Christian rock group that performed from 1967–1974
 Sons of Thunder (TV series), which ran from March to April 1999 on CBS
 Sons of Thunder (2019 TV series)

See also
 Sons and Daughters of Thunder (2019 movie)
 Thunderchild (disambiguation)